Alessandro Maggiolini (15 July 1931 – 11 November 2008) was the Roman Catholic Bishop of the Roman Catholic Diocese of Como, Italy.

Life

Born in Bareggio, Italy, Maggiolini was ordained a Roman Catholic priest for the Roman Catholic Archdiocese of Milan on 26 July 1955. On 7 April  1983 Pope John Paul II appointed Maggiolini bishop of the Roman Catholic Diocese of Carpi, Italy, and he was ordained a bishop on 29 May 1983. On 31 January 1989 Pope John Paul II appointed Bishop Maggiolini Bishop of the Como Diocese. Bishop Maggiolini retired on 2 December 2006.

In 2000, on rumors about the retirement of Pope John Paul II, Bishop Maggiolini said: "The church is not Fiat or General Motors. Its criteria cannot be efficiency. Even an elderly father can be the conscience of the church and continue to govern it."

Episcopal lineage

Maggiolini's episcopal lineage, or apostolic succession was:
 Cardinal Scipione Rebiba
 Cardinal Giulio Antonio Santorio
 Cardinal Girolamo Bernerio
 Archbishop Galeazzo Sanvitale
 Cardinal Ludovico Ludovisi
 Cardinal Luigi Caetani
 Cardinal Ulderico Carpegna
 Cardinal Paluzzo Paluzzi Altieri degli Albertoni
 Pope Benedict XIII
 Pope Benedict XIV
 Cardinal Enrico Enríquez
 Archbishop Manuel Quintano Bonifaz
 Cardinal Buenaventura Fernández de Córdoba Spínola
 Cardinal Giuseppe Doria Pamphili
 Pope Pius VIII
 Pope Pius IX
 Cardinal Alessandro Franchi
 Cardinal Giovanni Simeoni
 Cardinal Antonio Agliardi
 Cardinal Basilio Pompili
 Cardinal Adeodato Giovanni Piazza
 Cardinal Sebastiano Baggio
 Bishop Alessandro Maggiolini

Notes

1931 births
2008 deaths
Bishops of Como
20th-century Italian Roman Catholic bishops
21st-century Italian Roman Catholic bishops